Telegram is a 1971 Soviet adventure film directed by Rolan Bykov.

Plot 
The film tells about the boys who are looking for Katya Inozemtseva to give her an important telegram and they learn about her exploits.

Cast 
 Nina Arkhipova as Katya Inozemtseva	
 Elya Baskin as school teacher
 Yuri Nikulin as  Fedor Fedorovich
 Valentina Berezutskaya as pies seller
 Nikolay Burlyaev as Gleb, Zina's son
 Rolan Bykov as singing newcomer	
 Lyudmila Cherepanova as guitar player's girlfriend
 Aleksandra Denisova as Varya's grandmother 
 Rina Zelyonaya as children's writer
 Mikhail Yanshin as Nikolay Afanasevich Pyatipal
 Valentina Telegina as Marya Ivanovna, Fedor Fedorovich's wife
 Sergey Shustitsky as Lyosha Shaforostov
 Valery Ryzhakov as  Gleb's friend 
 Roman Filippov as episode

References

External links 
 

1971 films
1970s Russian-language films
Soviet adventure films
1970s adventure films
Mosfilm films
Films directed by Rolan Bykov
Russian children's adventure films
Soviet children's films